The Dehradun Literature Festival is an annual literary festival held annually in Dehradun, India founded by samraant Virmani who is also a well known social worker.

History 
It was founded in 2016 by Samraant Virmani, He took this initiative to bring exposure to the Doon valley which happens to be his hometown. Author Ruskin Bond is the brand ambassador of Dehradun Literature Festival.

2017 Edition 
The 2017 edition of the two-day Dehradun Literature Festival commenced at the ONGC Officers Club, Dehradun. The 2017 inaugural curtain raiser of Dehradun Literature Festival Shobhaa De, who launched Karan Johar's book The Unsuitable Boy.

Participants 

The following authors and literary personalities participated in the 2017 Dehradun Literary Festival.

 Shobhaa De
 Laxmi Narayan Tripathi
 Suchitra Krishnamoorthi 
 Piyush Mishra 
 Kiran Manral
 Rakhshanda Jalil
 Dr. Bijaylaxmi Nanda
 Divya Prakash Dubey
 Ashok Chakradhar
 Hridayesh Joshi 
 Laxmi Pant
 Sushil Bahuguna 
 Trepan Singh Chauhan
 Rajshekhar
 Sumrit Shahi
 Anuj Tiwari
 Savi Sharma
 Mona Verma

2018 Edition 
In January 2018, the curtain raiser of the 2nd season saw the attendance of Bollywood actor Shatrughan Sinha along with the writer of his biography Anything but Khamosh Bharathi Pradhan who is a film critic and a writer.

See also 

 Literary festival
 List of literary festivals in India

References

Literary festivals in India
Festivals established in 2016
2016 establishments in Uttarakhand
Culture of Uttarakhand
Literature of Uttarakhand
Festivals in Uttarakhand
Dehradun